Hip Hop TV is an Italian music TV channel devoted to hip hop, rap and rhythm and blues music, launched in Italy on SKY Italia channel 720 on 1 October 2008 with the song Laffy Taffy by D4L.
The owner is Seven Music Entertainment, owned by Gianluca Galliani, son of Adriano Galliani.

Programming 
 Mi Casa
 My Hip Hop TV
 Urban Charts
 Spin That Shit
 Club Me
 Open Mic

External links 
 http://www.hiphoptv.it/ 
 Hip Hop TV on MySpace

Music television channels
Television channels and stations established in 2008
Television channels in Italy
Italian-language television stations
Music organisations based in Italy